Somebody's Miracle is the fifth album by Liz Phair, released on October 4, 2005 (see 2005 in music) on Capitol Records. From September 2004 through April 2005, she composed fourteen tracks spanning from lo-fi guitar-driven to high-gloss produced tracks. Much like her debut album, Exile in Guyville,  Somebody's Miracle was originally modeled after another canonical album, Songs in the Key of Life by Stevie Wonder, though only elements of this exist in the final product.  The first single, "Everything to Me" was released to radio on August 1, 2005. Somebody's Miracle debuted at number 46 on the Billboard 200, and has sold over 83,000 copies in the U.S.

Album information
The album features a somewhat softer side of Phair, with themes of innocence, loss, and love. Many critics and fans accused Phair of having lost her edge. Phair responded to backlash by saying, "If you are an old fan and it doesn't fit what you need, don't buy the disc."

Release and promotion
Prior to the album's release, Phair embarked on an acoustic tour in the summer of 2005 in which she previewed the album's material. The tour, which had nine stops, commenced on July 26 in Boston, Massachusetts, and concluded on August 19 in San Francisco, California. To further promote the album, Phair headlined a month-long North American tour. The tour commenced on October 6 in Fort Lauderdale, Florida and concluded on November 16 in San Diego, California.

Phair also performed the album's title track on the Charmed episode "Battle of the Hexes". She was also the last artist to perform on the show.

Reception

The album has a score of 54 out of 100 on Metacritic, indicating "mixed or average reviews". One critic wrote, "Miracle contains the singer's most winning melodies to date, not to mention her most confident vocals." MSNBC wrote that in comparison to her 2003 self-titled album, Somebody's Miracle was "less blatantly commercial, but still smooth, reflecting her increasing shift toward a clearer sound". Rolling Stone, however, gave the album just two stars, calling her vocals "thin and dry" and the album as a whole "plain and forgettable". The A.V. Club wrote that Phair "has grown into the role of an MOR songstress."

This was Liz Phair's last album for Capitol Records. Her next album, Funstyle, was released on the independent label Rocket Science Records.

Track listing

Personnel 
Credits are adapted from the liner notes of Somebody's Miracle.

Production

 Liz Phair – writer
 John Alagía – producer, mixing, additional production, background vocal arrangement
 Brian Scheuble – engineering, mixing, recording
 Jeff Robinette – assistant engineer, additional engineering
 Dino Meneghin – producer
 Joe Zook – co-producer, engineering, recording
 John Shanks – writer, producer, mixing
 Jeff Rothschild – recording, mixing
 Lars Fox – additional engineering
 Shari Sutcliffe – contractor/project coordinator

 David Campbell – strings arrangement
 Allen Sides – strings recording
 Joel Derouin – concert master
 Tom Lord-Alge – mixing
 Ted Jensen – mastering
 Mary Fagot – creative direction
 Eric Roinestad – art direction, design
 Dusan Reljin – photography

Instruments

 Liz Phair – vocals, guitar, background vocals
 Dino Meneghin – electric guitar, acoustic guitar, lap steel guitar, keyboards, guitar, drum programming, hand percussion
 Aaron Sterling – drums, percussion
 Oliver Kraus – cello
 Tim Bradshaw – keyboards

 Sean Hurley – bass
 John Alagía – guitar, keyboards, B3 organ
 Bill Mohler – bass, acoustic bass
 John Shanks – bass, guitar, keyboards, background vocals
 Jeff Rothschild – drums
 Joe Zook – tambourine

Charts

Singles

Release history

References

Liz Phair albums
2005 albums
Capitol Records albums
Albums produced by John Shanks
Albums produced by John Alagía